Ashok Selvan (born 8 November 1989) is an Indian actor who works predominantly in Tamil cinema. He made his breakthrough playing one of the lead roles in Soodhu Kavvum (2013), before gaining critical acclaim for his performances in C. V. Kumar's productions Pizza II: Villa (2013) and Thegidi (2014). His recent blockbuster is Oh My Kadavule (2020) and Manmadha Leelai (2022).

Early life
Ashok was born to Panneerselvam and Malar on 8 November 1989 in Chennimalai, Erode, Tamil Nadu, India. He moved to Chennai at age three, and completed his schooling at Santhome Higher Secondary School, Chennai before graduating in Visual Communication from Loyola College. In college, Ashok Selvan participated in short films, completing a dozen short films as an actor as well as directing a few, including Green, which won Best Film at the 2012 International Tamil Thoth Conference held in Singapore.

Film career
After graduating from college, Ashok sought opportunities in films as an actor and auditioned for roles including in Prakash Raj's production Inidhu Inidhu and Bharat Bala's 19th Step but was rejected. During the period, he applied to work as an assistant director to S. J. Surya and was given the opportunity to feature in a few scenes as Suriya's friend in the director's venture 7aam Arivu, though his scenes did not make the final version. He was also featured in the title card of Chakri Toleti's Billa 2, with a childhood picture of Ashok Selvan used to represent a younger version of Ajith Kumar's titular character. He then also auditioned unsuccessfully for a role in Pizza, before Nalan Kumarasamy offered him the role of Kesavan in his black comedy film, Soodhu Kavvum (2013) after seeing him in a commercial. Featuring alongside an ensemble cast including Vijay Sethupathi, Bobby Simha and Sanchita Shetty, Soodhu Kavvum became a commercial success, with Ashok being described as "fantastic" in his role of an unemployed graduate.

Ashok was then selected to replace Vaibhav Reddy in Deepan Chakravarthy's psychological thriller Pizza II: Villa, a second film in C. V. Kumar's Pizza franchise. Portraying an English novel writer in the film, the film told the story of eerie happenings in a villa owned by Ashok's character. In order to portray the role of a 30-year-old writer, he gained weight and grew a beard within two weeks. The film opened to positive reviews and above average box office collections, with a critic noting that "Ashok delivers an outstanding performance". He collaborated with C. V. Kumar again in his third film, Thegidi, a murder mystery story directed by another newcomer P.Ramesh. Portraying a detective, Ashok featured opposite Janani Iyer, and won positive reviews for his acting in the film. A critic from Sify.com noted he "is subtle and conveys a lot through his body language and pleasing face", while another reviewer wrote "he seems to be quite proficient". His recently released movies are Kootathil Oruthan and Sila Samayangalil. Kootathil Oruthan deals with the love story of a middle bencher and its trailer has had a very positive reaction from the audience and the media. Sila Samayangalil directed by Priyadharshan was released in Netflix and made its way to the final round at Golden Globes. The film tells the story of eight characters who arrive at a pathology lab at 9a.m. to give their blood for an AIDS test. However, it all ends at 5p.m. when the results arrive. The film has been lapping appreciations in many festival circuits and in the recently held 9th annual Jaipur International Film Festival, Sila Samayangalil won awards for Best Film with a Global Message, Best Upcoming Release and the overall Best Film from the Asian Continent award. He is acting in a movie titled Oxygen directed by Ananda Krishnan and Nenjamellam Kadhal directed by Nirman. Oh My Kadavule was released on 14 Feb 2020 and was produced by his own banner Happy High Pictures in association with Axess Film Factory. Oh My Kadavule received positive reviews from critics and was a blockbuster hit at the box office. The movie star cast also includes Ritika Singh and Vani Bhojan.

Ashok made his Telugu cinema debut with the film Ninnila Ninnila along directed by Ani. I. V. Sasi in 2021. The movie star cast also includes Ritu Varma, Nithya Menen. He made his Malayalam cinema debut with an antagonistic role through Marakkar: Arabikadalinte Simham in 2021.

Filmography 
All films are in Tamil, unless otherwise noted.

Films

Web series

Television

Music Video

References

External links
 

Living people
Tamil male actors
21st-century Indian male actors
Male actors in Tamil cinema
1989 births
People from Erode district
Loyola College, Chennai alumni
Male actors in Telugu cinema